Bernard Fox may refer to:

 Bernard Fox (actor) (1927–2016), British film and television actor
 Bernard Fox (Irish republican) (born c. 1951), former member of the Army Council of the Provisional Irish Republican Army
 Bernard Fox (figure skater) (1916–1998), American figure skater